René Charles Marie Guyon (27 May 1876 – 1963) was a French jurist, best known for having written upon the topic of sexual ethics.

René Guyon was born at Sedan, Ardennes, and was involved in writing legal codes for Siam (present Thailand) and was the head judge of the supreme court of that country where he was given Thai name Phichan Bunyong. He died in Bangkok.

The René Guyon Society, a now-defunct pro-pedophile organization, was named after him, though he did not found the society nor was he involved with it.

Works
 "Human Rights and the Denial of Sexual Freedom" (1951)
 The Ethics of Sexual Acts (La légitimité des actes sexuels), reprinted at the University Press of the Pacific (2001), 
 La liberté sexuelle

References

External links 
 Sexuelle Menschenrechte — Magnus-Hischfeld-Archiv für Sexualwissenschaft

1876 births
1963 deaths
People from Sedan, Ardennes
French expatriates in Thailand
French jurists
French sexologists
20th-century jurists